The 2020 Podemos state assembly—officially the 3nd Citizen Assembly, and more informally referred to as Vistalegre III—was held virtually between 15 and 21 May 2020. The assembly was set to be celebrated on March, but the coronavirus pandemic in Spain delayed it until mid-May.

Background 
Pablo Iglesias, leader of Podemos, announced on January 2020 the celebration of the 3rd Citizen Assembly for March 2020, even though his mandate did not expire until February 2021. This decision was linked with the lack of contenders and the recent formation of the Spanish government, in which Podemos participated as the junior coalition partner.

However, due to the Covid-19 outbreak in Spain in early March, the Assembly was postponed and took place virtually.

Results

Secretary General

State Citizen Council

External links
 Podemos Third Assembly official web page

References 

Podemos (Spanish political party)
2020 conferences
Political party assemblies in Spain
Political party leadership elections in Spain